Hebo is the god of the Yellow River in China.

Hebo may also refer to:

Places
Hebo, Oregon, United States
Mount Hebo, Oregon, United States
Hebo, Shaoyang (河伯乡), a township of Shaoyang County, Hunan, China

People
Mathias Hebo (born 1995), Danish footballer
Romé Hebo (born 1992), Angolan handball player
Wang Hebo (1882–1927), Chinese politician

See also 
 Heebo (disambiguation)